The year 1971 in radio involved some significant events.


Events
2 January: A ban on radio and television cigarette advertisements goes into effect in the United States.
3 January: Open University begins broadcasts on the BBC in the United Kingdom.
5 January: FIP (France Inter Paris) begins broadcasting from Paris on 514 m (585 kHz).
19 January: Moscow Radio broadcasts criticism of the Sultan of Oman in Arabic. One of the accusations against him is that he allowed the setting up of a radio station called "Voice of the Free South" in opposition to the People's Democratic Republic of Yemen.
14 February: All of ABC Radio's FM stations change call letters, all on the same day:
WABC-FM in New York becomes WPLJ, for White Port & Lemon Juice.
KABC-FM in Los Angeles becomes KLOS, for Los Angeles.
KGO-FM in San Francisco becomes KSFX, for San Francisco (now KOSF).
KQV-FM in Pittsburgh becomes WDVE,  for a D o V E, the symbol of peace.
WXYZ-FM in Detroit becomes WRIF, for a guitar "R I F F" (legend goes that the calls were meant for WLS-FM to symbolize the cities' jazz scene).
WLS-FM in Chicago becomes WDAI (supposedly meant for WXYZ-FM to celebrate the Detroit Auto Industry; it had no meaning in Chicago).
KXYZ-FM in Houston becomes KAUM (today KHMX), meaning "Aumm", in Meditation terms; corresponding to Hippie meditative actions.
20 February: The U.S. Emergency Broadcast System sends an erroneous warning; many radio stations just ignore it, while WOWO in Fort Wayne takes it seriously and interrupts programming for 20 minutes.
2 March: 8HA is launched in Alice Springs, Northern Territory, Australia.
18 March: Prambors FM is launched in Jakarta, Indonesia.
26 March: Sheikh Mujibur Rahman declares Bangladesh's independence in a radio message.
1 April: Bayern 3, a public radio station owned and operated by Bayerischer Rundfunk, is launched in West Germany.
10 May: Members of the Front homosexuel d'action révolutionnaire (FHAR) interrupt a live radio broadcast on France's RTL, in which controversial presenter Menie Grégoire is introducing a phone-in on the subject of homosexuality.
24 May: U.S. Senator Clifford Case introduces Senate Bill 18, to remove funding for Radio Free Europe and Radio Liberty from the CIA's budget.
15 July: DXDB Radyo Bandilyo, an AM radio station owned by the Roman Catholic Diocese of Malaybalay, is launched in the Philippines. 
19 September: MBC FM4U, South Korea's second FM station, is launched.
2 November: Radio Waikato begins broadcasting in Hamilton, New Zealand, on 954 kHz AM.
19 November: Triple M Central Coast begins broadcasting from Gosford, New South Wales, Australia, under the name 2GO.
December: WNBC in New York lures Don Imus and his Imus in the Morning program away from WGAR (AM) in Cleveland (now WHKW); WGAR replaces him with fellow shock jock John Lanigan.
date unknown
Radio Malaysia becomes the first radio station in Malaysia to broadcast 24 hours a day, nationwide.
The FM- and TV-mast Helsinki-Espoo, the third highest structure in Finland, begins transmission.
WLOL-FM and KSJN, both in Minneapolis, Minnesota, participate in "quadcast" (quadraphonic) experiments.
Sergiu Celibidache becomes conductor of the Stuttgart Radio Orchestra.
David McCallum Sr. ends his tenure as leader of Mantovani's orchestra.

Debuts
January 18 – La Case Trésor, presented by Guy Lux, is broadcast for the first time in France (runs until 1976).
May 3 - All Things Considered, NPR's flagship news program, broadcasts for the first time.
 October – Odd Grythe begins hosting Husker du..., an entertainment show for the elderly, for the Norwegian Broadcasting Corporation.
 November 7 – WCCI-FM in Savanna, Illinois signs on at 100.1 FM. The station will later move to 100.3 FM.
 December – KOEL-FM, licensed to Oelwein, Iowa, signs on the air at 92.3 FM. Its initial format is country music.
date unknown
Bill Ballance begins hosting the Feminine Forum radio show on KGBS in Los Angeles
The Music of the NOW Man is launched on the American Forces Network in the Far East.
KRWC 1360 AM in Buffalo, MN signs on for the first time.

Births
 January 20 – Pixie McKenna, Irish doctor, radio and TV presenter
 April 16
High Pitch Eric, member of the Wack Pack from radio's The Howard Stern Show
Selena, US Latin singer and radio personality (died 1995)
 May 20 – Chris Booker, American radio and television personality.
 May – Frank Brinsley, host of The Frank Show
 June 10 – Kyle Sandilands, Australian radio presenter
 June 23 – Alan Cox, American comedian and radio personality, currently on WMMS in Cleveland, Ohio
 July 21 – Nuno Markl, Portuguese comedian and radio host
 July 30 – Tom Green, Canadian comedian and talk show host
 August 23 – Hugh Douglas, former NFL player, regular personality on Philadelphia sports radio station WIP
 August 26 – Thalía, Mexican singer, actress and radio presenter
 October 13 – Billy Bush, radio personality, co-host of TV show Access Hollywood, first cousin of George W. Bush
 October 20 – Dannii Minogue, Australian singer and radio presenter
December 17 – Alan Khan, South African radio DJ

Deaths
January 7 – Richard Kollmar, 60, actor and Broadway producer.
January 13 – Henri Tomasi, 69, French composer and conductor, one of the first radio conductors and a pioneer of "radiophonic" music
March 16 – Bebe Daniels, 70, US actress, writer, producer and radio personality (Life with the Lyons)
July 6 – Louis Armstrong, 69, African-American jazz musician, actor, singer, radio and TV personality
July 11 – Carleton G. Young, 64, American radio and television actor
October 3 – Seán Ó Riada, 40, Irish composer, former music director at Radio Éireann and presenter of Our Musical Heritage

References

 
Radio by year